Julien Moineau may refer to:

 Jules Moineau (anarchist), anarchist and signatory of the Manifesto of the Sixteen
 Julien Moineau (1903–1980), French road bicycle racer